Thomas E. Nichols is an American statistician. He is Professor of Neuroimaging Statistics and a Wellcome Trust Senior Research Fellow in Basic Biomedical Science at the Nuffield Department of Population Health of the University of Oxford, where he is also affiliated with the Big Data Institute. Previously, he taught in the Department of Biostatistics at the University of Michigan and at the University of Warwick; he also worked for GlaxoSmithKline as director of modeling and genetics at their Clinical Imaging Centre. He received the Wiley Young Investigator Award from the Organization for Human Brain Mapping in 2009 and was elected a Fellow of the American Statistical Association in 2012.

References

External links
Faculty page
Group page

Living people
American statisticians
Fellows of the American Statistical Association
University of Michigan faculty
Carnegie Mellon University alumni
Neuroimaging researchers
Academics of the University of Oxford
Academics of the University of Warwick
GSK plc people
Year of birth missing (living people)